Abdallah Dadi Chikota Nanyamba (born February 28, 1966) is a Tanzanian politician and a member of the Chama Cha Mapinduzi political party. He was elected MP representing Nanyamba in 2015.

References 

1966 births
Living people
Tanzanian MPs 2015–2020
Chama Cha Mapinduzi politicians